Herbert Whitley (1886 - September 15, 1955) was a millionaire and animal breeder who established Paignton Zoo zoological garden on his estate at Primley, Paignton, in Devon in the 1920s.

Paignton Zoo was founded initially as his private collection. Whitley was an early conservationist and a contemporary of people such as Sir Peter Scott and Jean Delacour, the famous French ornithologist. Paignton Zoo first opened to the public in 1923. It was one of the earliest combined zoological and botanical gardens in Britain and the first that was opened with education as its mission.

In 1928, Whitley's greyhound 'Primley Sceptre' became the first dog to win 'Best in Show' at Crufts.

When Herbert Whitley died in 1955, the Whitley Wildlife Conservation Trust (WWCT) was set up to continue his work. Since 2003, WWCT has owned and operated Newquay Zoo and Living Coasts. His estates also included the site of several local nature reserves in Devon, including Slapton Ley, now also run by the WWCT.

Timeline  
A brief history and photograph of Herbert Whitley can be found on the Paignton Zoo website. A fuller life story was published by Jack Baker in the book Chimps, Champs and Elephants (currently out of print).

 1923 - Primley Zoological Gardens (later Paignton Zoo) opened to the public.
 1955 - Herbert Whitley died.
 2003 - August 14 - Whitley Wildlife Conservation Trust purchased Newquay Zoo to operate as part of the charitable trust with Paignton Zoo and Living Coasts.

References

External links 
 Newquay Zoo official website
  Paignton Zoo official website
 Living Coasts official website

Zoo directors
Zoo owners
1886 births
1955 deaths